Sofia City Province is a province (oblast) of Bulgaria. Its administrative center is the city of Sofia, the capital of the country.

The province borders on Sofia Province and Pernik Province. It consists of only one municipality – the Sofia Capital Municipality.

Cities and towns 
Bankya, Buhovo, Novi Iskar, Sofia

Villages 
Balsha, Bistritsa, Busmantsi, Chepintsi, Dobroslavtsi, Dolni Bogrov, Dolni Pasarel, German, Gorni Bogrov, Ivanyane, Jeleznitsa, Jelyava, Jiten, Kazichene, Klisura, Kokalyane, Krivina, Kubratovo, Katina, Lokorsko, Lozen, Malo Buchino, Marchaevo, Mirovyane, Mramor, Negovan, Pancharevo, Plana, Podgumer, Svetovrachene, Vladaya, Voluyak, Voynegovtsi, Yana

Demographics

Population (2011 census): 1,291,591

Ethnic groups (2011):

Identified themselves: 1,178,131

 Bulgarians: 1,136,433 (96.4%)
 Roma: 18,284 (1.6%)
 others and indefinable: 23,614 (2%)
 A further 113,460 people did not answer the question for ethnic group.

References

External links 
 

Provinces of Bulgaria